The 2009–10 Kategoria e Parë was the 63rd season of a second-tier association football league in Albania.

Stadia and location

League table

Promotion playoffs

Relegation playoffs

References

 Calcio Mondiale Web

Kategoria e Parë seasons
2
Alba